Ralph Swillington (died 1525) was Recorder of Coventry and Attorney General to Henry VIII.

Swillington was Attorney General for the short period of time between 1524 and his death in the following year. In his will (dated 11 July 1525), he left land in Driffield, Yorkshire, to his nephew, George Swillington. A monument in St. Michael's Church, Coventry, commemorates Swillington, his wife Elizabeth (Babthorpe) and her other husband, Thomas Essex.

Sources

John Astley, The monumental inscriptions in the parish church of St. Michael, Coventry (1885)

John William Clay, North Country Wills (1912)

Attorneys General for England and Wales
People from Driffield
16th-century English people
1525 deaths
Year of birth unknown